Marco Stroppa (born 8 December 1959, in Verona) is an Italian composer who writes computer music as well as music for instruments with live electronics.

Biography
Marco Stroppa studied piano, composition, choral direction and electronic music at the conservatoires of Verona, Milan and Venice. From 1980 to 1984, Stroppa collaborated with the Centro di Sonologia Computazionale of the University of Padua, before moving to the United States, where he continued his studies at the Massachusetts Institute of Technology supported by a grant from the Fulbright Foundation until 1986. At MIT he took courses in cognitive psychology, computer science and artificial intelligence.

At the invitation of Pierre Boulez, Stroppa moved to Paris where he led the department for musical research at IRCAM from 1987 until 1990. In 1987, Stroppa founded the composition and computer music course at the International Bartók Festival in Szombathely, Hungary. Following teaching posts at the conservatoires of Lyon and Paris, Stroppa currently is professor of composition at the State University of Music and Performing Arts Stuttgart, where he succeeded Helmut Lachenmann in 1999.

Awards
 1985 ASCAP Prize
 1990 Cervo Prize for New Music
 1996 Composition prize of the Salzburg Easter Festival

Selected works
 1982–1984 Traiettoria for piano and computer-synthesized tape
 1987 Pulsazioni
 1987–1988 Spirali for string quartet
 1993–1994 Hiranyaloka for orchestra
 1989–1998 élet...fogytiglan for ensemble
 1994–1999 Zwielicht for electronics
 1996–1999 From Needle's Eye for trombone and ensemble
 1991–2002 Miniature estrose Vols. 1 & 2 (14 pieces for solo piano)
 2010 Let me sing into your ear for amplified basset horn and chamber orchestra

Discography

Further reading
 Jean-Noel von der Weid, Die Musik des 20. Jahrhunderts, Frankfurt & Leipzig, 2001, p. 729.

External links
 Marco Stroppa official website
 

1959 births
Italian male classical composers
Italian electronic musicians
Living people
Musicians from Verona
Academic staff of the State University of Music and Performing Arts Stuttgart